The Miami-Dade County Youth Fair & Exposition Inc., known for generations as The Youth Fair or just The Fair, is the largest nonprofit charity event in South Florida, attracting nearly 600,000 guests. It is a 21-day showcase of agricultural and educational exhibits, midway rides, concerts, carnival food and games, and family entertainment on the Fairgrounds at Tamiami Park located at SW 107th Ave. and Coral Way, Miami, Fla. 33165, its home since 1972.

Ranked as the largest attended fair in Florida and the 27th largest event of its kind throughout North America, it was organized and chartered as a not-for-profit association under Chapter 616 of the Florida Statutes.  In addition to producing a first-class public fair for four weeks each spring on an 86-acre complex, it operates the Expo Center the other 48 weeks of the year to provide exposition space for 70 shows and events. The fair is held by a private 16-member board of directors.

The 2021 Youth Fair dates are 18 November–05 December, excluding those Monday/Tuesday dates: 22–23 & 28–29 November, when it will be closed. The 2020 fair was cancelled as the COVID-19 pandemic was to blame.

Entertainment 

Concerts are free with general admission.

In 2018, the Mainstreet Stage was host to Gente de Zona, Ginuwine, La Adictiva Banda San José de Mesillas, La Maquinaria Norteña, Lecrae, Nelly, The Sugarhill Gang, and TLC. 

In 2017, the Mainstreet Stage was host to Skillet, Jacob Forever, Carlos Daniels and J. Alvarez. Luis Enrique served as Grand Marshall of the Opening Day Parade. 

In 2016, the Mainstreet Stage was host to Village People, MercyMe, Jessie James Decker, La Salsa Vive, Oscar D'Leon, Hansel, Sonora Carruseles, Tavares, and "Celebrating Celia Cruz" with performances by Willy Chirino, Aymee Nuviola, Jeimy Osorio and the Celia Cruz All Stars.

In 2015, the Mainstreet Stage hosted: Kool & The Gang, Music from the '80s with Shannon, Judy Torres, Johnny O and Nice & Wild.

In 2014, the Mainstreet Stage hosted: Music from the '90s with Cynthia, Rockell, Noel and TKA; Mr. Nice Guy Band; Los Tres de La Habana and Timbalive; Willy Chirino; Albita; Sonic Flood; Matthew West.

In 2013, the Mainstreet Stage hosted: "We Are the In Crowd"; Kidz Bop; Gocho; Matt Hunter.

In 2011, concerts included Mr. C & The Cha Cha Slide, Chino Y Nacho, Luis Enrique, FCW Stars & WWE Wrestling, Sid the Science Kid, The Ready Set, Natalie Grant, Jerry Rivera, The Dirty Sock Funtime Band, Paper Tongues, and Ricky C.

Features 

The Youth Fair offers student exhibits, plus agriculture exhibits, family entertainment, food stands, rides and shops.

The Midway has nearly 100 rides through provider North American Midway Entertainment. The list includes:
1001 Nachts
House of horror

Airplane
Love
Ring of love
Ring of Fire
Skater
SpaceRoller
Swing Tower
Remix
Fireball
Flume
Euroslide
Mega Drop 
Orbiter
Ferris Wheel
Spider
Tilt
Yoyo
Euroslide
Pharaoh's Fury
KMG - Hurricane

Disbursement 
Since inception, The Youth Fair has presented well above $11 million to the Miami-Dade community in the form of college scholarships, cash premiums and awards to students.

In 2018, its Scholarship Program awarded 182 non-renewable $1,000 competitive scholarships to graduating high school seniors attending Miami-Dade County public and private schools, including home school and charter school students, vocational students and alternative education students. Recipients included 16 students who plan to study for careers related to agriculture. 

The Youth Fair Scholarship Fund also allocates scholarship awards to the winners of the prestigious Elie Wiesel Foundation for Humanity Prize in Ethics Essay Contest for Miami-Dade County Public high school juniors and seniors.

Land Issue 
In 2013, Miami-Dade County began a process of discussing a possible relocation of The Youth Fair, which would allow Florida International University to expand its campus. The Youth Fair follows the terms of its lease with Miami-Dade County, which includes a provision for early termination. If the county identifies a relocation site that meets the terms of the lease equal to or better than the present site, and if FIU raises more than the $230 million that relocation will cost (plus the cost of land) there would be a three-year notice to move. However any possible move is, at the very least, years away.

References 

Buildings and structures in Miami
Annual fairs
Culture of Miami
Organizations based in Miami
Fairgrounds in the United States
Fairs in the United States
Tourist attractions in Miami